The Rochdale Observer is a tabloid newspaper published on Wednesdays and Saturdays for the  Metropolitan Borough of Rochdale, in Greater Manchester, England. It has been Rochdale's main newspaper since 1856.
It has also been a discussion point in BBC hit school based drama Waterloo Road.

References

External links
 Rochdale Observer homepage

Publications established in 1856
Newspapers published in Greater Manchester
Newspapers published by Reach plc